The 1988–89 Dallas Sidekicks season was the fifth season of the Dallas Sidekicks indoor soccer club. The season saw the team make the playoffs for the fourth consecutive year. The team hosted the 1989 Major Indoor Soccer League All-Star Game at Reunion Arena, losing to the MISL All–Stars, 8-1. The team also hosted an international exhibition against the Russian team Lokomotiv Moscow. The Sidekicks won 6-2 and the attendance of 12,111 was the second highest that year for the team. Long–time head coach Gordon Jago was promoted to General Manager on March 2. Assistant coach Billy Phillips was promoted into Jago’s position.

Roster

Schedule and results

Preseason

Regular season

Postseason

Final standings

x – clinched playoff berth

External links
 1988-89 Dallas Sidekicks season statistics at Kicks Fan fansite

Dallas Sidekicks (1984–2004) seasons
Dallas Sidekicks
Dallas Sidekicks